La Roche-aux-Fées is a Neolithic gallery grave, or dolmen, located in the commune of Essé, in the French department of Ille-et-Vilaine in Brittany. Its name comes from a legend that claims that the stones were placed by fairies. The dolmen consists of more than forty stones forming a corridor four times longer than wide. Its northwest-southeast axis is on an alignment with sunrise at the winter solstice.

Description
The tomb is one of the most famous and largest neolithic dolmens in Brittany. It consists of a covered passage of stone blocks, with roofing stones laid across them. It is about 20 metres long, and there are around 48 blocks, of which the heaviest weighs about 45 tonnes. the interior is divided into two separate chambers. The entrance is aligned with the rising sun at the winter solstice. The original structure would have been covered with a mound of stones and earth. It is thought to date from between 3000 and 2500 BC.

See also

 Prehistory of France

References

External links

Megalithic monuments in Brittany
Dolmens in France
Monuments historiques of Ille-et-Vilaine